Mengjiao Dai, Yi and Lahu People Township, commonly abbreviated as Mengjiao Ethnic Township or Mengjiao Township, is a rural township in Cangyuan Va Autonomous County, Yunnan, China.  it had a population of 13,990 and an area of . It is surrounded by Menglai Township on the north, Banhong Township on the west, Nuoliang Township on the east, and Mengdong Town on the south.

Name
The word Mengjiao is transliteration in Dai language. "Mengjiao" means a place to start a family.

History
In the early history, the area had always been under Tusi jurisdiction. Mengjiao was incorporated as a town in 1945, after the Second Sino-Japanese War. After the establishment of the Communist State in 1954, Mengjiao District was established. In 1968 it was renamed Mengjiao Commune and then was renamed Hongzhong Commune in the next year. In 1988 it was upgraded to an ethnic township.

Administrative division
As of 2017, the township is divided into 9 villages: Mengjiao, Lianhuatang, Kongjiao, Wengding, Mengka, Manggong, Nuozhang, Kongjing, and Menggan.

Geography

The largest body of water is Wengding Reservoir.

Economy
The area is rich in coal mines.

Natural rubber, cassava, tea, walnuts and rapeseed are major cash crops.

Education
The town has 8 primary schools and 1 middle school.

Religion

Jinlong Temple is a Buddhist temple in the township.

Transportation
The S314 Xiaocang Provincial Highway passes across the township.

Attractions
Part of the township belongs to Nangun River Natural Protection Area.

References

Bibliography
 

Divisions of Cangyuan Va Autonomous County